The New Jersey Division of Gaming Enforcement (DGE) is a governmental agency in the U.S. state of New Jersey that was established in 1977 under the Casino Control Act, N.J.S.A. to ensure the integrity of the casino gaming industry, including sports wagering at horse racetracks, in the state. The DGE operates within the New Jersey Department of Law and Public Safety in the office of the New Jersey Attorney General.

The DGE is supervised by a director appointed by the governor with advice and consent of the New Jersey Senate. The director serves during the term of office of the governor.

Activities

Monitoring Casinos 
DGE investigators monitor casino operations to find violations and assure regulatory compliance.

Licensing 
As each casino owner is obliged to have a license, the Division investigates all of license applicants and reports results to the NJ Casino Control Commission. The Commission conducts a public hearing to deny or grant a license. DGE has a list of licensed casinos in NJ that legal to operate in the state.

Regulatory Enforcement 
The DGE and Regulatory Prosecutions Bureau are responsible for implementing the CCC Rules and Regulations and the laws of the Casino Control Act. Both Bureaus investigate and sue violations of the Act and Regulations. They are responsible for the control of various areas of operation, including accounting and internal controls, rules of the games, gaming equipment,advertising, simulcasting, regulations of the Division of Alcoholic Beverage Control, underage gambling and drinking, exclusion list violations, and casino employee noncompliance.

Technical Services Bureau (TSB) 
The Bureau assures the integrity of all electronic gaming equipment, including all slot machine operations. It tests and evaluates slot machines, analyzes, and verifies jackpot payouts.

See also

Kevin F. O'Toole
New Jersey Casino Control Commission

References

External links
New Jersey Division of Gaming Enforcement

Division of Gaming Enforcement
Gambling in New Jersey
Gambling regulators in the United States
Government agencies established in 1977
1977 establishments in New Jersey